Stenocercus aculeatus is a species of lizard of the Tropiduridae family. It is found in Ecuador, Peru, and Bolivia.

References

Stenocercus
Reptiles described in 1879
Reptiles of Peru
Taxa named by Arthur William Edgar O'Shaughnessy